Lassie's Pet Vet is a reality television series about the health, lifestyle and community of pets. It is hosted by Jeff Werber and the collie, Lassie. This series is currently seen on WTTW in Chicago, Illinois, and on PBS stations in the United States.  At the end of each show, a snippet of the classic Lassie series is aired.

External links

Lassie's Pet Vet - Television Review

2007 American television series debuts
2007 American television series endings
2000s American reality television series
English-language television shows
Lassie television series
PBS original programming
Television shows about dogs
Television series by WTTW
Television series by Universal Television